Parliamentary elections were held in Hungary on 19 March 1967. The Hungarian Socialist Workers' Party was the only party allowed to contest the elections, and won 259 of the 349 seats, with the remaining 90 going to independents selected by the party. 

The elections were the first held under new electoral laws enacted in 1966 that made it possible for more than one candidate to run in a constituency. However, in order to be eligible, all prospective candidates had to accept the program of the Patriotic People's Front, which was dominated by the HSWP. Even under these new rules only nine of the 349 constituencies had more than one candidate.

Results

References

Elections in Hungary
Parliamentary
Hungary
One-party elections

hu:Országgyűlési választások a Magyar Népköztársaságban#1967